Homewood Field is the athletics stadium of the Johns Hopkins University in Baltimore, Maryland.

History 
It was built in 1906 and has an official capacity of 8,500 people. The name is taken, as is that of the entire campus, from the name of the estate of Charles Carroll of Carrollton. Homewood Field is located on the northern border of the campus. It serves as the home field for the university's football, soccer, field hockey, and lacrosse teams.

It was also the home field for the professional lacrosse team, the Baltimore Bayhawks, for the 2001 and 2003 Major League Lacrosse seasons. It hosted the Division I NCAA Men's Lacrosse Championship in 1975, and was the site for the 2016 Big Ten men's lacrosse tournament. The south grandstand is named for Conrad Gebelein (1884–1981), longtime music director at the university.

While known primarily for being the "Yankee Stadium of Lacrosse", its largest record crowd actually filled the stands for a football game. In 1915 on Thanksgiving Day, 13,000 spectators watched Hopkins grind out a 3–0 win over in-state rival Maryland. Fletcher Watts scored the game-winning field goal as the last moments ticked down. From then until 1934, the teams met on that day all but two years.

References

College field hockey venues in the United States
College lacrosse venues in the United States
College football venues
College soccer venues in the United States
Chesapeake Bayhawks
Johns Hopkins Blue Jays football
Johns Hopkins Blue Jays men's lacrosse
NCAA Men's Division I Lacrosse Championship venues
Premier Lacrosse League venues
Former Major League Lacrosse venues
Sports venues in Baltimore
American football venues in Maryland
Lacrosse venues in Maryland
Soccer venues in Maryland
1906 establishments in Maryland
Sports venues completed in 1906